In ice hockey, an official is responsible for enforcing the rules and maintaining order. On-ice officials are present on the ice during the game, and traditionally wear a shirt with black and white vertical stripes. The National Hockey League (NHL) currently employs four on-ice officials in each game—two referees and two linesmen. Referees are identified by their red or orange armbands. They are responsible for the general supervision of the game, assess penalties, and conduct face-offs at the beginning of each period and after a goal is scored. When play is stopped for another reason, the face-offs are conducted by the linesmen. The linesmen are primarily responsible for violations involving the centre line and blue lines, such as icing and offside infractions.

All NHL on-ice officials are members of the National Hockey League Officials Association (NHLOA), a labour union founded in 1969.  The NHLOA represents its members in matters dealing with working conditions of on-ice officials and acts as their collective bargaining agent.

Current officials

Referees

Linesmen

Former NHL officials 

  
  
  
  
  
  
   (March 5, 1930 – January 5, 2008) – Deceased
  
  
  
  
  
   (November 2, 1938 – July 5, 2007) – Deceased
  
   (1940 – November 21, 2013) – Deceased
  
  
  
  
   (1928 – September 11, 1990) – Deceased
  
  
  
   (October 10, 1915 – October 24, 2009) – Deceased
  
   (September 13, 1946 – November 30, 2016) – Deceased
  
   (February 25, 1902 – November 10, 1986) – Deceased
  
  
  
  
   (September 21, 1937 – May 29, 2005) – Deceased 
  
  
  
  
  
  
  
  
   (August 20, 1878 – March 13, 1913) – Deceased
  
  
  
  
  
  
   – Deceased
  
  
  
  
  
  
   (August 19, 1927 – August 11, 2010) – Deceased
  
  
  
  
   – Deceased
  
  
   – Deceased
  
  
   (January 23, 1892 – January 9, 1969) – Deceased
  
  
  
  
   – Deceased
   (February 25, 1886 – October 26, 1964) – Deceased
  
  
   (March 2, 1948 – March 22, 2021) – Deceased
  
  

  
  
  
  
   (September 19, 1945 – October 17, 2012) – Deceased
  
  
  
  
  
  
  
  
   – Deceased
  
  
   (June 20, 1956 – November 23, 2018) – Deceased
  
  
  
  
  
  
  
  
  
  
  
   (February 25, 1945 – December 16, 2018) – Deceased
   Hired to NHL contract at age 20, at that time the youngest referee ever hired by the NHL.
  
  
  
  
  
  
  
  
  
   – (May 5, 1967 – April 22, 2005) – Deceased
  
  
   (April 24, 1891 – January 11, 1978) – Deceased
  
  
  
  
  
   (July 13, 1958 - September 6, 2022 - Deceased
  
  
  
  
  
  
  
  
  
   (September 2, 1928 – April 19, 2009) – Deceased
   (July 22, 1890 – October 3, 1978) – Deceased
  
  
  
   – Deceased
  
  
  
  
  
  
  
  
  
  
  
  
   (September 22, 1939 – April 1, 2016) – Deceased

Officials in the Hockey Hall of Fame

References

External links
National Hockey League Officials Association
Referees/Linesmen – Legends of Hockey
NHL Records: Referees and Linesmen

 
Officials
National H